Do Borjeh (also Romanized as Do Borcheh) is a village in Shoqan Rural District, Jolgeh Shoqan District, Jajrom County, North Khorasan Province, Iran. At the 2006 census, its population was 290, in 103 families.

References 

Populated places in Jajrom County